The Z380 and Z382 are Zilog 16-bit/32-bit processor from 1994. It is Z80 compatible, but it was released much later than its competitors (the Intel 386 and Motorola 68020) and as a result was never able to gain any significant market leverage. On the other hand, the newer and faster eZ80 family was more successful.

The chip supports 32-bit processing with a clock speed of up to 20 MHz.

The Z380 is incompatible with Zilog's older Z800 and Z280. As the Z380 is derived from the newer Z180 it is a less mini computer like design than these older processors, with fewer features. Instead, it has a wider ALU and register length of 32-bits. It can therefore address 4 GB directly:
 Similar pipelined execution or fetch/execute overlap as the Z280
 Simpler MMU, without memory protection.
 Minimum of 2 clocks/instruction. This is like the Z280, but also for 32-bit operations.
 No on-chip cache, as it is redundant with the faster static RAMs of the 1990s and onwards.
 Lacks the I/O trap feature

The Z382 is marked as a Data Communications Controller and in addition to the Z380 has addition I/O features.
 16550 Mimic with I/O Mailbox, DMA Mailbox, and 16 mABus Drive
 3 HDLC Synchronous Serial Channels–Serial Data Rate of up to 10 Mbps
 GCI/SCIT Bus Interface
 8 Advanced DMA Channels with 24-Bit Addressing
 Plug-and-Play ISA Interface
 PCMCIA Interface 
 2 Enhanced ASCIs (UARTs) with 16-Bit Baud RateGenerators (BRG)
 Clocked Serial I/O Channel (CSIO) for Use with SerialMemory
 Two 16-Bit Timers with Flexible Prescalers
 Three Memory Chip Selects with Wait state Generators
 Watchdog Timer (WDT)
 Up to 32 General-purpose I/O Pins
 DC to 20 MHz Operating Frequency @ 5.0V
 DC to 10 MHz Operating Frequency @ 3.3V
 144-Pin QFP and VQFP Style Packages

References
Notes

Bibliography

Further reading
 
 

Zilog microprocessors
32-bit microprocessors